Joanne Wise (born 15 March 1971) is a female former British track and field athlete who competed in the long jump. In 1998, she won the Commonwealth Games gold medal in Kuala Lumpur. She also competed at the Barcelona Olympic Games in 1992 and the Sydney Olympic Games in 2000.

Career
Wise was born in Solihull, England and was a member of Coventry Godiva Harriers. An excellent junior, she was AAA's Junior champion at Under 15, Under 17 and Under 20 levels. She also won two English schools titles. In 1987, she finished fifth at the European Junior Championships in Birmingham. The highlight of Wise's junior career came in 1988 in Sudbury, Canada at the World Junior Championships, when she won a bronze medal with a wind-assisted jump of 6.69 m. Both world and European junior titles were won by Wise's longtime domestic rival Fiona May. She went on to finish seventh at the 1989 European Juniors in Varaždin (6.16 m) and ninth at the 1990 World Juniors in Plovdiv (6.14 m)

In 1992, Wise competed at her first Olympic Games but had a disastrous time in the qualifying round, managing only 5.87 m for 26th overall. At the 1993 World Championships, she was 23rd in the qualifying round with 6.20 m.

After struggling with injuries, Wise entered the best phase of her career at the 1997 World Indoor Championships, finishing fourth with 6.70 m, which tied the UK indoor record of Susan Hearnshaw set in 1984. She missed the bronze medal by just one centimetre. Later that same year, she narrowly missed the final at the World Championships in Athens. In 1998, she represented England and became the Commonwealth Champion with a jump of 6.63 m, ahead of Jackie Edwards and Nicole Boegman. In 1999, at the World Championships in Seville, she finished fifth in the final with a jump of 6.75 m, just short of her lifetime best of 6.76 m, which she had set in Malmö two weeks earlier.

Wise competed at her second Olympic Games in Sydney, 2000, failing, by just one centimetre, to reach the final.
She was also twice AAA's Champion (1999 & 2000), three times AAAs Indoor Champion (1992, 1997 & 1999) and was twice UK Champion (1992 & 1997).

Wise's indoor best of 6.70 m, remained the UK indoor record for fifteen years, until 2012,  when Shara Proctor jumped 6.89 m. As of 2018, Wise's best of 6.76 m, ranks her equal 11th on the UK all-time list alongside Mary Rand.

International competitions

Notes:
 (q) indicates overall position in qualifying round.
 (w) indicates wind-assisted jump
 At the Olympic Games, Wise was promoted one position due to the drugs disqualifications of Nijolė Medvedeva (1992) and Marion Jones (2000).

External links

References

1971 births
Living people
British female long jumpers
English female long jumpers
Olympic athletes of Great Britain
Athletes (track and field) at the 1992 Summer Olympics
Athletes (track and field) at the 2000 Summer Olympics
Commonwealth Games gold medallists for England
Commonwealth Games medallists in athletics
Athletes (track and field) at the 1998 Commonwealth Games
World Athletics Championships athletes for Great Britain
Sportspeople from Solihull
Medallists at the 1998 Commonwealth Games